This is a List of political parties in Eastern Europe, linking to the country list of parties and the political system of each country in the region.

List of countries

See also
Council of Europe
Eastern Europe
Eastern European Group
Eastern Partnership
Euronest Parliamentary Assembly
European integration
International organisations in Europe
List of political parties by region
Politics of Europe
Table of political parties in Europe by pancontinental organisation

Political parties in Europe
Politics of Europe